Trevell Gerald Coleman (born November 19, 1974), better known by his stage name G. Dep (which stands for "Ghetto Dependent"), is an American rapper from Harlem, New York City. He joined Bad Boy Records in 1998 and released his debut album Child of the Ghetto in 2001. He released his second album Ghetto Legend on September 7, 2010 with Famous Records.

Early life 
Trevell Coleman was born on November 19, 1974. He was raised by his grandmother in the James Weldon Johnson Housing Projects.

Music career 
He started rap with the label Tape Kingz and released 2 vinyls in 1995 and 1996. After meeting with Sean Combs in 1998, G. Dep was signed to a $350,000, five-album deal with Bad Boy Records. In the next year, he appeared on two songs on Black Rob's 1999 debut album Life Story. G. Dep released his debut solo album Child of the Ghetto in 2001. Child of the Ghetto peaked at #106 on Billboard 200 and #23 on Top R&B/Hip-Hop Albums. Single "Special Delivery" from the album peaked at #59 on Hot R&B/Hip-Hop Songs and #3 on Hot Rap Singles.

G. Dep was subsequently dropped from Bad Boy Records. G. Dep and Loon released independent album Bad Boy in 2007. He released his second album Ghetto Legend on September 7, 2010 with Famous Records.

Personal life 
Coleman stated in an interview that he has been convicted of robbery and served time in Rikers Island. Coleman's criminal record includes arrests for drug offenses, burglary and grand larceny more than 25 times since 2003.

After the release of Child of the Ghetto, Coleman had a long-time struggle with PCP addiction. In 2008, Coleman told XXL about his substance abuse problems and rehabilitation. At the time of his latest arrest Coleman was in Narcotics Anonymous' twelve-step program.

Coleman is currently married to Laticia Evans Coleman. The two have been married for six years now and have exchanged vows at Elmira Correctional Facility. Coleman's wife is also a Hip-Hop artist whose rap moniker is Hustle Bunny. The two met in 1999 and both were previously married. The two have five grandchildren.

Murder case 
On December 15, 2010, Coleman walked into 25th Precinct to turn himself in. He confessed to a cold case crime, a murder of a Queens man in 1993. Coleman had attempted to confess twice before, but was previously considered to be under the influence of drugs and incoherent.

On October 19, 1993, John Henkel was shot in the chest by a .40-caliber handgun outside of James Weldon Johnson Houses on Park Avenue and East 114th Street. Coleman stated that he ambushed and shot Henkel during an attempted robbery and fled the scene throwing his weapon into the East River. Coleman's information matched with the case and he was charged with murder. Coleman told in an interview that he confessed because the case weighed on him and he was "just trying to get things right between himself and God". Coleman claimed that he did not know that his victim died.

Sean Combs commented on G. Dep's situation on Sirius' Shade 45 radio show, saying Coleman did the "right thing" by confessing.

Coleman pleaded not guilty to second-degree murder at his appearance in New York Supreme Court on January 13, 2011. He was convicted of the second-degree murder charge on April 17, 2012 and was sentenced to 15-years to life in prison on May 8, 2011. He is housed at Fishkill Correctional Facility, in Beacon, NY and will be eligible for parole in 2025.

Discography 

Child of the Ghetto (2001)
Ghetto Legend (2010)

References

External links
G. Dep on Myspace
G. Dep Discography on Discogs

1974 births
Living people
African-American Christians
African-American male rappers
American people convicted of murder
American prisoners and detainees
American robbers
Bad Boy Records artists
People from East Harlem
Prisoners and detainees of New York (state)
Rappers from Manhattan
Underground rappers
Hardcore hip hop artists
21st-century American rappers
21st-century American male musicians
21st-century African-American musicians
20th-century African-American people